Héricourt-en-Caux (literally Héricourt in Caux) is a commune in the Seine-Maritime department in the Normandy region in northern France.

Geography

Population

Places of interest
 The church of St. Denis, dating from the nineteenth century.
 Three chapels.
 A sixteenth-century stone cross.
 A watermill.
 The chateau de Boscol, dating from the sixteenth century.
 The motte of an old castle.

See also
Communes of the Seine-Maritime department

References

External links

Official Website 

Communes of Seine-Maritime